Clas Håkan Jesper Strömblad (born 28 November 1972) is a Swedish musician who is the guitarist of the bands The Halo Effect, Dimension Zero and Cyhra, and formerly of In Flames and The Resistance. He is best known as the founder and former guitarist/drummer/keyboardist of the pioneering melodic death metal band In Flames, guitarist of the band Sinergy, bassist of Ceremonial Oath and drummer of HammerFall. In 2013, he joined MDM band Nightrage as a session guitarist.

In 2004, Strömblad (along with Björn Gelotte) was ranked No. 70 out of 100 Greatest Heavy Metal Guitarists of all time by Guitar World.

Early life
Strömblad began playing music at age four, with a violin he played until age 12, when he no longer considered the violin a "cool" instrument to play and began playing guitar instead. Despite being left-handed, he learned to play the guitar with his right hand.

Bands

Ceremonial Oath (1990–1993)
In 1990, Strömblad became the new bass player of the band once known as "Striker" (although he was not in the band under that name), then "Desecrator" and finally Ceremonial Oath where he quit by 1993 after not being able to have at least some control in the band. The band disbanded in 1996, but in 2012, it was announced the band reunited for an appearance at the inaugural edition of The Gothenburg Sound festival, that took place 5–6 January 2013 at Trädgår'n in Gothenburg, Sweden, with Strömblad back in the band.

HammerFall (1993–1997)
Oscar Dronjak also of Ceremonial Oath, formed a new band being HammerFall inviting Strömblad as the drummer in 1993. He is falsely listed as the drummer on their album Glory to the Brave for an unknown reason when the real drummer on the album was Patrik Räfling; the album was released in 1997 when Strömblad left, although he still helped the band write songs later on.

Dimension Zero (1995)
In 1995, Strömblad formed his second side project which he started with former In Flames guitarist Glenn Ljungström, first being known as Agent Orange then Dimension Zero, which he is the guitarist (formerly bassist) of the band, but the band has been on hiatus since 2008. In May 2014, Dimension Zero was confirmed for the 2015 edition of the Gothenburg Sound Festival, at Trädgårn.

Sinergy (1997)
In 1997, when Kimberly Goss was in Dimmu Borgir they did a joint tour with In Flames. Goss spoke to Strömblad about forming a female fronted band, but due to time constraints, they were unable to get together. When Goss quit Dimmu Borgir and moved to Sweden, the duo recorded the album Beware the Heavens.

All Ends (2003)
In 2003, Strömblad and his then In Flames bandmate Björn Gelotte formed another side project called All Ends, for which they both wrote the music. They recorded a demo although neither had intended to be part of the group, due to In Flames' demanding schedule.

In Flames (1993–2010)
During 1993, his last year in Ceremonial Oath, he wanted to write music and combine melodies inspired by Iron Maiden, with the brutality of death metal; something which Jesper stated he had never heard any band do. Now free to control a band, he formed his first one, In Flames, which was considered a side project. The first demo he made with the band was shipped off to the owner of Wrong Again Records, who liked it so much that the owner spoke to the members of In Flames and with the pressure of being signed, the band lied stating they had 13 songs done; intrigued, the band got the deal over the phone. He started in the band as the drummer but switched to guitar by the next year.

On 3 February 2009, the band's website inflames.com announced that Jesper would not be participating in the Australia/South America/Japan tour in order to get treatment for his alcohol abuse problems. Niclas Engelin was announced as his replacement for the tour. On 12 February 2010, the same problem that he had in 2009, he announced that he was leaving In Flames permanently for personal problems and health issues.

Jesper's comment on the situation was:

The Resistance
After playing Call of Duty online with Marco Aro from The Haunted, Strömblad discussed with Aro about forming a new band in which Aro joined; that band is The Resistance, alongside fellow former In Flames guitarist Glenn Ljungström, Alex Losbäck Holstad of Despite, and Chris Barkensjö of Carnal Forge, forming in 2011. Strömblad left the resistance on 1 March 2016.

The Halo Effect (2020–present)

Side projects
Strömblad was working on another side project together with Roland Johansson, former singer of the Swedish metal band Sonic Syndicate.

In 2012, the Swedish movie Isdraken, directed by Martin Högdahl and for which Strömblad composed the original music was released in theatres.

Equipment
Strömblad currently uses ESP Guitars guitars, and used them extensively before the release of Reroute to Remain. Jesper used his signature variant of the EX series, until he switched to Gibson guitars with his bandmate Björn Gelotte. He switched to Gibson for the release of Reroute To Remain, but returned to ESP for the recording of Soundtrack To Your Escape. Strömblad returned to Gibson after the release of Come Clarity. Jesper used the Gibson Flying V and Explorer Voodoo models, as well as some Gibson Gothic Explorer II's. Since his departure from In Flames and his subsequent formation of The Resistance Strömblad has been playing the Cort Z-Custom 2. After joining Cyhra in 2017, Jesper began using ESP Guitars again, alongside bandmate Euge Valovirta. His main guitar is currently a snow white ESP Snakebyte.

Jesper is known for using the Peavey 5150/6505 amp. Strömblad also uses a Line 6 rack-mounted POD just like Gelotte.

Discography 
with Ceremonial Oath
 Promo 1991 (1991)
 The Book of Truth (1993)

with In Flames

 Lunar Strain (1994)
 The Jester Race (1996)
 Whoracle (1997)
 Colony (1999)
 Clayman (2000)
 Reroute to Remain (2002)
 Soundtrack to Your Escape (2004)
 Come Clarity (2006)
 A Sense of Purpose (2008)

With HammerFall (songwriting credits)
Glory to the Brave (1997) 
Legacy of Kings (1998) 
Renegade (2000) 
No Sacrifice, No Victory (2009)

With Sinergy
 Beware the Heavens (1999)

With All Ends (songwriting credits)
Wasting Life (2007, EP)
All Ends (2007)
A Road to Depression (2010)

With The Resistance
 Rise from Treason (2013, EP)
 Scars (2013)

With Cyhra
 Letters to Myself (2017, LP)
 No halos in hell (2019, LP)

With The Halo Effect
 Shadowminds (2021, single)
 Feel What I Believe (2022, single)
 Days of the Lost (2022, single)
 The Needless End (2022, single)
 Days of the Lost (2022, album)

Guest appearances
 1997: Withering Surface – "Scarlet Silhouettes": Guitar Solo at "Scarlet Silhouettes"
 1997: Misanthrope – "Visionnaire": Guitar solo at "Hypochondrium Forces"
 1998: Exhumation – "Dance Across the Past": Guitar Solo at "Images of Our Extinction"
 1999: Grievance – "The Phantom Novels"
 2007: Annihilator – "Metal": Guitar Solo at "Haunted"
 2013: Angelica – "Thrive": Guitar Solo at "I Am Strong"
 2013/2014: Nightrage – Session Live

References

External links
 In Flames – official website
 Dimension Zero – official website
 All Ends – official website

1972 births
Living people
Musicians from Gothenburg
Rhythm guitarists
Swedish heavy metal guitarists
Swedish multi-instrumentalists
21st-century guitarists
HammerFall members
In Flames members
Ceremonial Oath members
Dimension Zero (Swedish band) members
The Resistance (Swedish band) members
Sinergy members